The 233d Space Group (233 SG) is a unit of the Colorado Air National Guard located at Greeley Air National Guard Station, Greeley.  The 233d Space Group provides immediate, worldwide missile warning, space launch and detection in the event of an attack against the United States. If activated to federal service, the Wing is gained by the United States Air Force Space Command.

Overview
The 233d Space Group operates the Air Force's strategic survivable, mobile Defense Support Program ground station. The group provides endurable missile warning detection to the National Command Authority and has the ability to survive and operate through all phases of trans/post attack. In addition, the satellites provide immediate, worldwide missile warning, space launch, and nuclear detonation detection.

History
The history of the 233d Space Group is not so much in the unit designation, but in the equipment operated. The 233d Space Group activated 1 October 1995, assuming the mission of the 4th Space Warning Squadron (4 SWS), Holloman AFB, New Mexico.

Mobile DSP Communications
The mobile Defense Support Program (DSP) communication mission began on 1 October 1983, as the 1025th Communications Squadron (Mobile). The 1025 CS spent its first three years testing the new mobile satellite communications equipment and training its people. On 1 November 1985, administrative operations were transferred to the 1st Space Wing, part of the newly formed Air Force Space Command. The 1025th Space Communications Squadron was redesignated as the 4th Satellite Communications Squadron on 1 August 1986. During an Air Force-wide reorganization, the 1st Space Wing and the 3d Space Wing were inactivated, and their assets merged into the newly renamed 21st Space Wing, at Peterson AFB, Colorado. The unit was renamed the 4th Space Communications Squadron. Finally, on 1 October 1992, the 4th SCS's mission was declassified. When the duties of the 4th SWS transferred to other space projects, the mobile DSP mission was transferred to the newly formed 233d Space Group, activated in 1995.

Assignments

Major Command/Gaining Command
Air National Guard/Air Force Space Command (1995 – present)

Previous designations
 1 October 1983 – The 137th SWS activated as the 1025th Satellite Communications Squadron (SCS)
 1 August 1986 – The 1025th SCS was redesignated as the 4th SCS.
 1 October 1992 – The 4th SCS's mission was declassified and became the 4th Space Warning Squadron.
 1 October 1995 – The 137th Space Warning Squadron activated
 1 March 2012 – The 137th Space Warning Squadron was redesignated as the 233d Space Group

Equipment Operated
Mobile Ground System (MGS) of the Defense Support Program (1995 – present)

References

External links
140wg.ang.af.mil: 137th SWS Awards
Buckley.af.mil: Team Buckley Security Forces team dominates at Guardian Challenge
Buckley.af.mil: 460th Space Wing (137thSWS) competing in Guardian Challenge 2010

Groups of the United States Air Force
Space units and formations of the United States Air Force
Military units and formations established in 2012
Military units and formations in Colorado